AMT Nike is a small turbojet, used to power model aircraft and some jetpacks.

Applications
 JB-9

Specifications

References

Microjet engines